Andrei Vladimirovich Gefel (born 24 June 1979) is a former Russian professional footballer.

External links

1979 births
Living people
Russian footballers
Association football midfielders
FC Kyzylzhar players
FC Tobol Kurgan players
FC Irtysh Omsk players
FC Smena Komsomolsk-na-Amure players
Kazakhstan Premier League players
Russian expatriate footballers
Expatriate footballers in Kazakhstan
Russian expatriate sportspeople in Kazakhstan
FC Amur Blagoveshchensk players